The Genius of America (1923) is book written by Stuart Sherman. The book is a study and opinion piece on the youth of America for the future generations of America "Studies in Behalf of the Younger Generation".

External links
 The full text of The Genius of America at the Internet Archive

1923 non-fiction books
Books about the United States